Arun Poulose (born 22 July 1986) is an Indian-born cricketer who plays for the Oman national cricket team. He made his List A debut on 10 February 2010 in the Vijay Hazare Trophy. In February 2016, he was named in Oman's squad for the 2016 ICC World Twenty20.

He made his Twenty20 International (T20I) debut for Oman in the 2017 Desert T20 Challenge against the Netherlands on 15 January 2017.

References

External links
 

1986 births
Living people
Indian cricketers
Kerala cricketers
Cricketers from Kochi
Omani cricketers
Oman Twenty20 International cricketers
Indian emigrants to Oman
Indian expatriates in Oman
People from Aluva